Rentian, formerly known as Taiping, is a town in Shanghang County, Longyan, in southwestern Fujian province, China.

Geography 
The  runs through the town. 76.9% of the town is forested.

Administration
The town administers 18 administrative villages:

 Taihu
 Huahou
 Zhutian
 Shipai
 Dayan
 Nankeng
 Yekeng
 Caikeng
 Guantian
 Meizhen
 Changtan
 Butou
 Liansi
 Fenglang
 Lougang
 Fengshan
 Zhenqi
 Qikeng

Economy 
As of 2018, the town's primary sector totaled ¥425 million, the secondary sector totaled ¥253 million, and the tertiary sector totaled ¥1.019 billion.

Mineral resources in the town include molybdenum, iron, rare earth elements, manganese, and kaolinite.

Rentian's major crops include pomelo, lemon, and camellia.

Culture 
Many of the town's inhabitants are Hakka, with the six prominent Hakka clans in the town being the Liu, the You, the Huang, the Liu, the Qiu, and the Chen.

Transportation 
Fujian Provincial Highway 309 runs north to south thru the town.

Notable people 

 , People's Liberation Army General

Notes and references

Township-level divisions of Fujian